The Boston Blazers are a lacrosse team based in Boston playing in the National Lacrosse League (NLL). The 2009 season was their first season in the NLL.

The Blazers began their inaugural season by losing back-to-back games to the division rival (and eventual East division champion) New York Titans. But the Blazers surprised everybody by winning seven of their next eight games, on their way to a 10-6 record, tied with New York and Buffalo for best in the East. The Titans won the East on tie-breakers, but the Blazers finished a respectable third and made the playoffs in their first season.

In the Eastern division semi-final, the Blazers were defeated by the defending champion Buffalo Bandits 11-8.

Regular season

Conference standings

Game log
Reference:

Playoffs

Game log
Reference:

Player stats
Reference:

Runners (Top 10)

Note: GP = Games played; G = Goals; A = Assists; Pts = Points; LB = Loose balls; PIM = Penalty minutes

Goaltenders
Note: GP = Games played; MIN = Minutes; W = Wins; L = Losses; GA = Goals against; Sv% = Save percentage; GAA = Goals against average

Transactions

Trades

Entry draft
The 2008 NLL Entry Draft took place on September 7, 2008. The Blazers selected the following players:

Roster

See also
2009 NLL season

References

Boston
Mass